KFF A&N is a women's football club based in Prizren, Kosovo. The club competes in Kosovo Women's Football League which is the top tier of women's football in the country. Their home ground is the Përparim Thaçi Stadium which has a seating capacity of 10,000.

See also 
 List of football clubs in Kosovo

References 

Football clubs in Kosovo
Women's football clubs in Kosovo
Association football clubs established in 2017
2017 establishments in Kosovo